Story Untold is the self-titled EP by pop punk band Story Untold. This is the first release by the band since being signed to a label, and the only album to feature Mehdi Zidani on drums since the band's signing.

Track listing
All songs were written by Janick Thibault except " History", which was written by Janick Thibault, Pierre Bouvier, and Chuck Comeau. 

All of the songs appear on the EP The Things We Say, with the exception of "History", "Give Up On Us", and "What If". These three appear on a rare EP the band released under the name Amasic, called Endless Possibilities.

 "Everything is OK"
 "You're A Freak"
 "History"
 "Give Up On Us"
 "Another Night"
 "If I Had One Dollar"
 "What If"

Personnel
Story Untold
 Janick Thibault - lead vocals, songwriting, rhythm guitar
 Simon LePage - bass guitar

References

Story Untold (band) albums
2016 EPs
Hopeless Records EPs